The Hawaii Department of Transportation (HDOT) maintains the smallest state-maintained system of state highways in the country.

The state's four Interstates, all located on O‘ahu, are built to mainland standards unlike their counterparts in Alaska and Puerto Rico. The first three routes (H-1, H-2, and H-3) were approved in 1960, while an auxiliary route (H-201) was added in 1989.

Primary and auxiliary interstates

Primary and secondary routes
The current state (then territorial) highway numbering system was established in 1955. Route numbers are organized so that the initial digit corresponds to the island:
 Numbers beginning with 1 or 2: Hawaiʻi
 Numbers beginning with 3: Maui
 Numbers beginning with 4: Molokaʻi, Lānaʻi
 Numbers beginning with 5: Kauaʻi
 Numbers beginning with 6 to 9: Oʻahu

In general, two-digit numbers are primary highways, maintained by the state. Three-digit routes are typically secondary arterials or collectors, while four-digit routes are typically collectors and minor roads. For secondary routes, the first two digits generally relate to the associated primary route. Many secondary routes are county-maintained and unsigned, their route numbers being used merely by state agencies as an asset-tracking measure.

When referring to highways, Hawaiʻi residents usually refer to state highways by their names instead of their route numbers (e.g. Kamehameha Highway instead of Route 99). Note that one named highway may encompass several route numbers (e.g. Kamehameha Highway, which carries Routes 80, 83, 99, and 830 at various points along its length) and vice versa.

Temporary Federal routes
During World War II, a temporary Federal route numbering system was setup on the island of Oahu. They were used to assist military personnel not accustomed to the Hawaiian street names during the time of Martial law in the Territory of Hawaii from 1941 to 1945. Though marked with U.S. Route shields, they were never part of the United States Numbered Highway System.

See also

References

External links

 AARoads Hawaii Highways Page
 Hawaii Highways

 
1955 establishments in Hawaii
State Highways
Hawaii